Boxmoor is part of Hemel Hempstead in Hertfordshire. It is within the district of Dacorum and comprises mainly 19th-century housing and meadowland, with transport links from London to the Midlands. At the 2011 Census, the population of Boxmoor was included in the Dacorum ward of Bovingdon, Flaunden and Chipperfield.

History

The name Boxmoor derives from the box tree, a bushy inhabitant of the chalky hills that surround the location. This is linked together with the word 'mor', which signifies a marshy spot; Boxmoor's ancient watermeadows are still a major feature of the locality.

A mesolithic camp site was discovered in 1975 on the site of what is now Boxmoor trout fishery, close to Fisheries wharf. Finds include 'pot boiler' stones, bones of the wild ox, Bos Primigenius and a hand-crafted grinding  quern made of the hard local rock known as Hertfordshire puddingstone. All were dated to around 1500 BCE. An even older stone axe head dated to 6000 BCE was also discovered.

The remains of a Roman villa have been found in the grounds of Boxmoor House School, near the railway station, dating from around the 1st or early 2nd century AD.

The Box Moor Trust owns meadow land in the area alongside the River Bulbourne. This was land purchased by tenants in secret during the 16th century to prevent it being enclosed, which would have deprived them of grazing. It is still held by the same trust established at that time. Today, it is used for summer grazing and has open access for recreational use.

The ancient Box Lane runs uphill from Boxmoor to Bovingdon. On this lane, close to the Boxmoor end, stood the historic early 17th century Box Lane Chapel. See the section below on places of worship.

The Sparrows Herne turnpike, set up in 1762, was the stagecoach route from London to Aylesbury and passed along the valley bottom through Boxmoor following the present day London Road (A4251). The Grand Junction Canal, latterly known as the Grand Union, and the trunk canal from London to the Midlands followed along the same route in 1804. A local public house, the Fishery Inn, was an historic refreshment stop on the canal.

Boxmoor village itself was developed after 1837 when the London and Birmingham Railway was forced, by local landed interests, to build its main line and station about a mile to the west of Hemel Hempstead town. The railway station, originally called Boxmoor, offered fast commuting to London combined with a small country town life, attractive to wealthier commuters and this stimulated the development of Victorian era housing near the railway station but outside the original bounds of Hemel Hempstead. In 1846, it became part of the London and North Western Railway (L&NWR).

In 1877 a branch line – known as the "Nicky Line" – was opened by the Midland Railway running from the London and North Western Railway's Boxmoor railway station, through Hemel Hempstead to Harpenden. However, disputes between the railway companies prevented this from ever being used for a passenger connecting service and the railway station's link to Hemel town was always via horse, bus or on foot across the Boxmoor meadows. Hemel Hempstead railway station was from 1912 known as "Boxmoor and Hemel Hempstead".

The area was absorbed into the expanded Hemel Hempstead new town during the 1950s and 1960s but retains a local character. The railway station was then renamed from Boxmoor to Hemel Hempstead.

A four-lane dual carriageway, the A41 trunk road, was built through the district in the 1990s, connecting the M25 to Aylesbury. This crosses Boxmoor meadows in a strip of land in which all the earlier links run side by side: turnpike, canal, railway and modern trunk road.

Boxmoor Hall was built by the local trust in 1889 from surplus funds. It has been used as a magistrates' court, and more recently as an arts centre run by Dacorum Borough Council. In 2007 the hall became privately owned. It is now used for performing arts, and is a licensed premises hosting special occasions.

Economy
The area has little industry and limited commerce but its mostly Victorian family houses are in demand for those who work elsewhere in Hemel Hempstead and especially commuters who use the railway station to reach London in around 30 minutes.

Religious sites

Box Lane Chapel, a Non-conformist chapel founded in 1668 on land owned by the Westbrook Hay estate, was re-built in 1690 and then altered in 1856 and again in 1876. Tradition has it that Oliver Cromwell once worshiped here at an earlier building on the site. It is now a private house after being sold in 1969.

There was a Primitive Methodist chapel at Crouchfield built in 1849, which was in the St Albans Circuit.  This stood until the congregation moved to Bourne Chapel in Chaulden in 1959, which is now called Hemel Hempstead Methodist Church.

St John's Church was built, in 1874, on part of the Box Moor Trust land.

Sports And Entertainment

Boxmoor Cricket Club

Boxmoor Cricket Club was founded in 1857 when the Box Moor Trust let some of their land be used as a cricket pitch that is known as the Boxmoor oval which had a pavilion added in the 1930s.

Hemel Hempstead Theatre Company

Originally known as The Hemel Hempstead Operatic and Dramatic Society, the Hemel Hempstead Theatre Company has operated since 1925. Over the years the company performed in a number of locations, including the Luxor Cinemas in the Marlowes and St. John’s Hall at 72 St. John's Road, which had been built in 1930 as extension of the nearby St. John’s Church. The first-ever theatrical performance at St. John’s Hall was given by the Theatre Company in April 1932. Hemel Hempstead Theatre Company purchased the St. John's Hall building in 1997 and renamed it the Boxmoor Playhouse. Holding up to 200 seats, The Boxmoor Playhouse is said to be the largest theatre in Hemel Hempstead. Each year the Company produces a variety of productions from plays to musicals to pantomimes. Due to the flexibility of the space, the Company also holds social events such as quiz nights, creative workshops and cabaret evenings.

Notable residents and people

Robert Snooks became, in 1802, the last highwayman to be hanged and buried at the scene of his crime, after he robbed a postboy on the turnpike on Boxmoor meadows. His remains are interred in Boxmoor meadows near the place where he was hanged and the likely spot is marked by two stones, erected by the Box Moor Trust in 1904.

Rock musician and producer Steven Wilson spent his childhood in Boxmoor, and for many years maintained his No Man's Land studio in his former bedroom in his parents’ bungalow.

British/Canadian actor Michael Bradshaw grew up in Boxmoor from 1938 until the mid-1950s.

Further reading 
 
 
.

References

External links

 Boxmoor — a parish created in Victorian times from part of the parish of Hemel Hempstead
 Box Moor Trust 
 Local government 
 Boho Boxmoor — community news and events 

Villages in Hertfordshire
Areas of Hemel Hempstead